Loop 289 is a multi-lane beltway servicing Lubbock as a freeway. The highway serves as the southern end for Interstate 27 on the south side of the city. The highway passes about a mile south of Lubbock Preston Smith International Airport on the north side near the intersection with I-27.

History
Lubbock is among the smallest U.S. cities to be encircled by a beltway or loop highway. Loop 289 is a grade-separated controlled-access freeway. Built from 1960 to 1972, it is 26 miles (42 kilometers) long. When first constructed, Loop 289 passed through entirely rural areas. Today, urban sprawl extends beyond the beltway, especially in southwestern Lubbock.

Loop 289 was designated on September 20, 1955.

I-27, completed through Lubbock in 1992, serves as the city's north–south freeway. In 2004, construction began on the Marsha Sharp Freeway, the east–west freeway. Cosigned as US 62 / US 82 at its interchange with the east leg of Loop 289, the Marsha Sharp Freeway begins northeast of downtown Lubbock and extends to a mile west of the west leg of Loop 289. From there, it is under construction and is to be extended west to the nearby suburb of Wolfforth.

Lane configuration
Loop 289 is a complete loop freeway with four to six mainline lanes. The freeways have frontage roads for nearly the entire route. It is one of only three complete controlled-access loops in Texas, the other two being Interstate 610 and Beltway 8 (Sam Houston Parkway, and Sam Houston Tollway), both of which encircle Houston.  At certain junctions, the freeway widens using auxiliary (exit only) lanes. At most interchanges with other highways, there are partial to full access ramps, that directly serve the mainline lanes and/or frontage roads.

Popular culture
The Dixie Chicks reference Loop 289 in "Lubbock or Leave It", a track from their 2006 release Taking the Long Way. The lyric reads: 'Oh, boy, rave on down Loop 289 /
That'll be the day you see me back in this fool's paradise".

Exit list
Counter-clockwise (CCW) reads down and clockwise (CW) reads up.

References

289
Freeways in Texas
Transportation in Lubbock, Texas
Transportation in Lubbock County, Texas
Beltways in the United States